The Best Things in Life Are Free  is a 1956 American musical film directed by Michael Curtiz. The film stars Gordon MacRae, Dan Dailey and Ernest Borgnine as the real-life songwriting team of Buddy DeSylva, Lew Brown and Ray Henderson of the late 1920s and early 1930s; and Sheree North as Kitty Kane, a singer (possibly based on Helen Kane).

In 1957, the year after the film was released, it received an Oscar nomination for Lionel Newman in the category of Best Music, Scoring of a Musical Picture.

Plot

Cast
Gordon MacRae as Buddy DeSylva
Dan Dailey as Ray Henderson
Ernest Borgnine as Lew Brown
Sheree North as Kitty Kane
Tommy Noonan as Carl Frisbee
Murvyn Vye as Manny Costain
Phyllis Avery as Maggie Henderson
Larry Keating as Winfield Sheehan
Tony Galento as Fingers
Norman Brooks as Al Jolson
Jacques d'Amboise as Specialty dancer
Roxanne Arlen as Perky Nichols
Byron Palmer as Hollywood star
Gordon Richards as Butler

Reception

Critical response
Premiering in September-1956, The Best Things in Life Are Free was met with mixed reviews. Some reviews called it "the biggest new musical this year" and others "a musical-comedy that could've been produced on a higher budget with bigger and better production numbers".

Box office performance
Being a musical, though a modestly produced one, the movie was fairly expensive to produce. The film ended with a budget of $2.86 million and made just over $4 million at the box office, earning $2,250,000 in North American rentals in 1956.

Songs
"Lucky Day"
Music by Ray Henderson
Lyrics by Lew Brown and Buddy G. DeSylva
Sung by Dan Dailey
"If I Had a Talking Picture of You"
Music by Ray Henderson
Lyrics by Lew Brown and Buddy G. DeSylva
Sung by Byron Palmer
"Here Am I, Broken Hearted"
Music by Ray Henderson
Lyrics by Lew Brown and Buddy G. DeSylva
Sung by Gordon MacRae
"Button up Your Overcoat"
Music by Ray Henderson
Lyrics by Lew Brown and Buddy G. DeSylva
Sung by Dan Dailey and Gordon MacRae
"Good News"
Music by Ray Henderson
Lyrics by Lew Brown and Buddy G. DeSylva
Sung by Gordon MacRae
"You're the Cream in My Coffee"
Music by Ray Henderson
Lyrics by Lew Brown and Buddy G. DeSylva
Sung by Dan Dailey
"The Best Things in Life Are Free"
Music by Ray Henderson
Lyrics by Lew Brown and Buddy G. DeSylva
Sung by Sheree North (dubbed by Eileen Wilson)
"Lucky in Love"
Music by Ray Henderson
Lyrics by Lew Brown and Buddy G. DeSylva
Sung by Gordon MacRae
"Black Bottom"
Music by Ray Henderson
Lyrics by Lew Brown and Buddy G. DeSylva
Choreographed by Rod Alexander and danced by Sheree North and Jacques d'Amboise
"Birth of the Blues"
Music by Ray Henderson
Lyrics by Lew Brown and Buddy G. DeSylva
Danced by Sheree North and Jacques d'Amboise
"Sonny Boy"
Music by Ray Henderson
Lyrics by Lew Brown and Buddy G. DeSylva
Sung by Norman Brooks
"Follow Thru"
Music by Ray Henderson
Lyrics by Lew Brown and Buddy G. DeSylva
"One More Time"
Music by Ray Henderson
Lyrics by Lew Brown and Buddy G. DeSylva
"Thank Your Father"
Music by Ray Henderson
Lyrics by Lew Brown and Buddy G. DeSylva
"This Is the Missus"
Music by Ray Henderson
Lyrics by Lew Brown
"Together"
Music by Ray Henderson
Lyrics by Lew Brown and Buddy G. DeSylva
”It All Depends on You"
Music by Ray Henderson
Lyrics by Lew Brown and Buddy G. DeSylva
"You Try Somebody Else (We'll Be Back Together Again)"
Music by Ray Henderson
Lyrics by Lew Brown and Buddy G. DeSylva
"Without Love"
Music by Ray Henderson
Lyrics by Lew Brown and Buddy G. DeSylva

References

External links

 (in German)

1956 films
1950s biographical films
1956 musical films
20th Century Fox films
CinemaScope films
American biographical films
American musical films
1950s English-language films
Films about composers
Films directed by Michael Curtiz
Films scored by Lionel Newman
Films set in the 1920s
Biographical films about musicians
1950s American films